Sheleen Thomas is an American female singer from New York City who was the featured vocalist on So Pure!'s 1999 Billboard Hot Dance Music/Club Play chart topper, "Changes."

References

See also
List of number-one dance hits (United States)
List of artists who reached number one on the US Dance chart

Year of birth missing (living people)
Living people
Singers from New York City
American women singers
American dance musicians
American house musicians
21st-century American women